Whitsundays is an island group locality in the Whitsunday Region, Queensland, Australia. It mostly consists of the Whitsunday Group of islands off the Queensland east coast in the Coral Sea, a mix of inhabited and uninhabited islands.

Geography 
The larger islands in the locality include, from north to south:

 Hayman Island
 Hook Island
 Whitsunday Island
 North Molle Island
 Cid Island
 South Molle Island
 Haslewood Island
 Long Island
 Hamilton Island
 Dent Island

In addition to the island, the locality includes a small area of mainland Queensland near the Airlie Sports Park.

Education 
Hayman Island State School is a government primary (Prep-6) school for boys and girls at Hayman Island. In 2017, the school had an enrolment of 6 students with 2 teachers and 0 non-teaching staff.

Hamilton Island State School is a government primary (Prep-6) school for boys and girls at Hamilton Island. In 2017, the school had an enrolment of 56 students with 5 teachers (4 full-time equivalent) and 7 non-teaching staff (4 full-time equivalent).

References 

Whitsunday Region
Localities in Queensland